A Mariña Oriental is a comarca in the Galician Province of Lugo. The overall population of this  local region is 28,955 (2019).

Municipalities
Barreiros, A Pontenova, Ribadeo and Trabada.

References

Comarcas of the Province of Lugo